Fukuyama may refer to:

People
 Francis Fukuyama, Japanese-American philosopher and political economist
 Fukuyama (surname), other people with the name

Places
Fukuyama, Hiroshima, city in Japan
Fukuyama, Kagoshima, former town in Japan, now part of Kirishima city

Other uses
Fukuyama congenital muscular dystrophy (FCMD)